Patrick the Great is a 1945 American drama film starring Donald O'Connor, Peggy Ryan, and Frances Dee. This was the last film for O'Connor and Ryan together, who had been a teenage team for the past several years. This was also O'Connor's last film before he went to serve in World War II.

Plot

Pat Donahue (Donald O'Connor) is living and working in the highland region of western Massachusetts, but longs for a career in show business.  The young, but talented, Donahue hears about an opening in New York, and travels to the auditions.  He wins the role, but later finds out that it was originally intended for his father Patrick Donahue (Donald Cook).  Judy Watkin (Peggy Ryan) considers the younger Donahue her boyfriend, but a New York sophisticated young lady Lynn Andrews (Frances Dee) catches the young man's eye.  The young Donahue struggles with his reluctance to do what's right with respect to his father.  Comedy and music are in abundant supply in this romp.

Cast

 Donald O'Connor as Pat Donahue, Jr.
 Peggy Ryan as Judy Watkin
 Frances Dee as Lynn Andrews
 Donald Cook as Pat Donahue, Sr.
 Eve Arden as Jean Mathews
 Thomas Gomez as Max Wilson
 Gavin Muir as Prentis Johns
 Andrew Tombes as Sam Bassett
 Irving Bacon as Mr. Merney
 Emmett Vogan as Alsop
 unbilled players include Neely Edwards, Lassie Lou Ahern and Ray Walker

External links 

 

1945 films
1945 drama films
American drama films
Universal Pictures films
Films scored by Hans J. Salter
American black-and-white films
Films directed by Frank Ryan
1940s American films